Teddy Lo (born 1974 in Hong Kong) is a Hong Kong-based artist known for his work with the medium and technology of light, especially LED light. His work explores neo-transcendental ideas in the physical-scientific world.

Biography 
Teddy Lo was born and raised in Hong Kong with his father’s family background in technological manufacturing and mother was an artist with family background from the deep mountains of Taiwan, making a living as farmers and hunters.  While growing up, Lo was captivated by his perceived difference of basic human needs in technology spending his time divided in big metropolitan cities and rural areas.  Having been introduced to the works of Claude Monet at a young age, he began to develop a fondness for fine arts.  

Later, he had the opportunity to pursue his studies in US, where he developed an interest on conceptual and artistic depth of its advertising industry and contemporary arts.  Eventually enrolled in Art Center College of Design in California to complete a BFA degree in art direction.  It was during a fine art class and a visit to a lighting factory that inspired the artist to explore LEDs as an artistic medium.  After graduation, Lo moved to NYC to work in advertising and continued his artistic journey.  He had his first art exhibition at the Arturo Dimodica Gallery, NYC and since then, began working on lighting design projects.

In 2007, Lo moved back to Hong Kong and founded a LED experience design company LEDARTIST. He then earned his Master’s degree on Lighting at Queensland University of Technology which led to a career in light art and design.  He has since participated in various international art exhibitions and large-scale lighting projects. Lo held exhibitions in prestigious locations around the world, including Luminale in Frankfurt, Asia Society in Hong Kong, Museum of Art and Design in NYC, Shanghai Museum of Contemporary Arts, Art Centre BUDA Kortrijk in Belgium, Hong Kong Museum of Art, Esplanade in Singapore, 798 Art District in Beijing and Burning Man Festival in Nevada, among others.  In addition with commission work for the tallest building in China - The Shanghai Tower and created the digital media infrastructure designs for the new World Trade Center in NYC.

Artist Statement 
Teddy's creative vision evolves around neo-transcendental art, the integration of spiritual ideas in the physical-scientific world. His work is inspired by current technologies and technological reality.  It manifests in artistic expressions through light. 

Artificial light is being developed and implemented in society at a rapid pace driven by economic rather than human-sustainable measures.  Their team are only at the tip of the iceberg in our current discoveries of the potentials in artificial light to become part of our biological ecosystem. Teddy's art departs from research on light and the electro-magnetic spectrum.  It evolves from computational graphics, engineering and programming to research in sculptural design, spectrum manipulation and interactivity. During the past decade he has examined how to display colliding data or various states of different particles simulations in 2d or 3d LED artworks, as data visualisation and real time interactive light art. He has illuminated space with different colour spectrums through refraction and reflection to provide unique experiences on physical, emotional, spiritual and mental levels, and combined ancient old chrome-therapy with new LED technology. 

Having worked with light as a material of art for well over a decade, and belonging to the third generation of a family involved with the invention, production and business of light (from the incandescent light bulb to LEDs), he is concerned with the artistic engagement as well as industrial and societal implementation of light as sustainable and neo-transcendental material. His research and artistic practice depart from a combination of advancements of modern technologies and ancient philosophies on presence and human well-being.

Teddy believes technology should be a tool for human beings to assist and excel our natural capabilities and evolution towards more sustainable modes of co-existence with the world. By means of technology, today we as a species are able to do much more, bigger, faster, and reach farther, and with more impact than ever before.  They develop technology that extend our capabilities and progression, but not with our environmental co-existence in mind.  The contemporary world’s industries are jeopardizing our planet’s resources and decreasing our mental well-being, making us dependent on technology.   The more evolved we become, we need to realize our responsibility as a planetary specie in this world and aim to create a sustainable living environment with love for nature and all living things.  We have to unite mind, body and spirit and explore the extent of our collective, universal consciousness. Teddy sees an urgency in catching up with spiritual depths to what it means to be human along with technological innovations; in regaining our abilities to connect with nature’s subtle voices through technology.

Grants and Awards

Exhibitions

Recent Artworks

1. BEWILDERED UNIVERSE “PIA03606”
Bewildered Universe “PIA03606” is an abstract artwork that conveys the frequency of energy in our universe. Inspired by nebula images by NASA and the concept of time from Chinese I-Ching philosophy, the artwork hypothesizes a transcendental state of energy vibrations with the still imagery. The image captures light travels from thousands of light years ago. Various paint pigments on the image react to an invisible UV spectrum of light. These effects, made with kinetic LED light, depict the relations of the object’s distance from planet earth through the speed of light. The calculations follow the theoretical concept of time proposed with the theory of fractal geometry, which differs nature’s phenomena in kind by fractal and infinite math. The work explores a neo-transcendental quality of ancient philosophy with modern technology – a bewildered universe beyond our comprehension that affects the consciousness of matter.

(The artwork is a collaboration with AI Artist - MICA)

2. ANAHATA SERIES | CELESTE PRIZE, LONDON,UK
Anahata Series incorporated the artist’s long time research topic of Chroma-therapy to reinvent the still image of the artist's Spectrum Manners series. The artist has added the vibrational energy by superimposing the image with sacred geometry patterns using both visible and invisible ink. Lit by UV and RGB LEDs, it mirrors an illuminated state of consciousness – making the invisible visible. Additionally, the artist has programmed a specific sequence of spectrum colour on the print image to evoke another dimension of Chromatherapy and luminous energy for psychological and spiritual healing. Overall, the artwork aims to inspire self-realization through the merging of mind, body and soul.

3. QUINTESSENCE | LUMIERES LIGHT FESTIVAL, HONG KONG
The artist believes that humans must embrace imaginative evolvement in accordance with time. There is a need for positive spiritual evolution and enlightenment in all human beings in order for us to advance and live on this planet in harmony. The sculpture is inspired by an astral divine figure – Metatron, whose supreme stature inspires knowledge, ascension and spiritual growth. The white LED light acts as the supreme ray in a manner of a cosmic alchemy.

Quintessence is an ongoing art research project and examines behaviours of a sculpture of the future that is reactive or interactive, whether it is through physical or mental triggers, data or through generative algorithm. An interactive system is designed for the spectators to activate the sculpture by sending the positive energy physically or digitally. Metaphorically, the sculpture collects ‘light codes’ from audiences to be stored as a higher form of ‘intelligent energy’, which bring about personal evaluation, clarity and guidance to influence a collective unconscious of the planet and aid planetary evolution. The Quintessence is a research project of spreading and receiving the importance of "Unity" energy around the world.  Which is the next phase of evolutionary goal for human being.

With all the turmoils, confusions and stress that Hong Kong has gone through in recent years, Quintessence has a strong presence with an important message to the city (and the world) and makes a dynamic, creative and technological expression for the first local light festival - Lumiere HK.
With the evolvement of aesthetic, human behaviors and technologies, Quintessence will present new interactivities and meanings due to different time and space.

4. SEVEN KEYS | CHI K11 ART SPACE, HONG KONG
Seven Keys is an artistic research project by artists, musicians and holistic healers. It is a project about balancing vibrations, frequency and the electromagnetic field for the human being. Ancient colour chambers are simulated with the aid of 21st century aesthetics and technologies. Through triggering the five senses with sensual elements in seven designated spaces, the goal of this project is to create a positive, blissful environment and eventually bringing epiphany and calmness to human consciousness.
Collaborating Artists
Angela Flame x Magnolia May Polley x Teddy Lo

5. TECHNO NATURE – BACILLUS | ASIA SOCIETY, HONG KONG
The world is going through a whirlwind of technological advancements and our habitat is evolving towards more efficient, intuitive and environmentally sustainable standards. New technology allows electronics to become more compact and flexible, which make organic electronic sculptures more practical. This is the new artificial nature on which we base and develop our futuristic lifestyle. The first sculpture of the artist’s Techno Nature Series, the Bacillus sculpture signifies the essence of this new age and represents the dawn of a new breed of techno inspired sculptures. The concept of the form comes from the oldest known single-celled organism, the Bacillus, dating back 250 million years. For the sculpture’s expression the artist merges the old with the new; the old method of structural welding with the new sustainable luminous technology, 3D prototyping and interactive systems. The Bacillus is equipped with bleeding edge luminosity, sensory and audio capabilities. The sound and visual sequences are activated by the viewer’s interaction in response to th sculpture’s visual clues, which in turn elicits various ‘emotional’ states from the Bacillus. Single or multiple viewers can produce different behaviors from the piece resulting in an experience of Synesthesia.

6. VICTORIA HARBOUR SPEKTRUM | HONG KONG
In January 2004, Hong Kong’s Secretary of Finance, Tourism Commission, and the Hong Kong Tourism Board joined forces to commission the first “A Symphony of Light” light and music spectacle for Victoria Harbour.
Named the ‘World’s Largest Permanent Light and Sound Show’ by Guinness World Records, the light show is based on synchronized sound, lasers and dynamic illumination of over 47 significant buildings in Hong Kong starting at 8pm every evening lasting 13 minutes. These buildings overlook the city’s famous Victoria Harbour that is unarguably the most significant attraction for the 60 million tourists that visit Hong Kong annually.
Since its inception, the competition has been illuminating; the Eiffel Tower’s lighting system is upgraded every other year, while the Vivid Sydney Festival and Singapore’s Marina Bay are continuously refreshing their displays by inviting creative artists to display new and innovative visual projections.
Teddy Lo Studio is introducing the Victoria Harbour Spektrum project with a showcase on the growth of local talent, so that anyone with a creative mind may paint the sky on what could become the world's largest digital canvas.

7. POSITIVE VOID | 798 Art District, Beijing, China / Museum of Contemporary Art (MOCA), Shanghai / Museum of Contemporary Art (MOCA), Shanghai
The omnipresence of digital information is overwhelming. Billboards, web advertisements, viral marketing, social media – advertising is an inescapable presence in the contemporary society to the point where it has become an expected, practically ignored part of the modern landscape. We have developed, as a species, a steadily growing immunity to commercial messages and cues, prompting advertisers and marketers to increase the speed, frequency and force of the messages they deliver. Positive Void, an LED artwork using the “persistence of vision” technique, seeks to co-opt and undermine this pervasive force by electronically animating images of what is increasingly lacking in 21st century lives: nature, love, the senses and the life force.

8. PHAEODARIA |  HONG KONG MUSEUM OF ART
The marine-inspired, information-based lighting installation Phaeodaria act as an energy capsule that interplay LEDs with the wireless technology of Hong Kong. It represents the underlying energy and information flowing through the heart of Hong Kong with LEDs programmed to react to the invisible frequencies and radiation that dominate our life in the information age: from GSM to Bluetooth, 3G to Wi-Fi signals.

9. MEGA POV | LIGHT MARINA BAY FESTIVAL, SINGAPORE
This is an installation that utilizes the technique of persistence of vision to animate objects with motion and lights. This digital installation presents motion with digital programming and flickers of light through light-emitting diodes. The artwork is a study of how digital information can be delivered to our human visual system through this reverse technique, even within a limited projection area. This art piece is meant to remind you of the essence of life and that nothing is trivial in this world. Mega POV is exhibited as one of the installations in the Singaporean sustainable light art festival, I Light Marina Bay in 2012.

10. GON KIRIN | BLACK ROCK CITY, USA
Gon KiRin (GKR) is an art project created by Lo in collaboration with Ryan Doyle. This art car was designed using metal and LED fixtures to create a dragon onto a deconstructed 1963 Dodge dump truck with a 318 engine.
 
Gon KiRin has two levels of climbing space with seating for more than 20 people in the dragon's mouth and on a party couch on its back where riders can move its tail back and forth. A 1,500-pound DJ booth mounted on a Marine Zodiac attack boat sits on the second story. The dragon features a hydraulic neck and a massive flamethrower in its mouth.
 
Gon KiRin was built in five months by a dedicated 15-person team. It debuted at the 2010 Burning Man as a Mutant Vehicle. It was also featured at the Maker Faire and the New York Halloween Parade in 2011. GKR returned to Burning Man again in 2012.

Creative contributions
 Media art consultant for Hong Kong Art Development Council
 Board of director of Microwave Media Art Group
 Board of director of Hong Kong Ambassador of Design
 Main organizer of This Happened Hong Kong

References

External links
http://www.teddylo.tv 
http://www.lightengine-tech.com
http://www.leigrow.com
http://www.microwavefest.net/

Hong Kong artists
Queensland University of Technology alumni
Living people
1974 births